St Mary's Church is a parish church in East Peckham, Kent. It is a Grade II listed building.

Building 
Built of coursed rubble stone with a tiled roof.

History 
The "New Church" of the Most Holy Trinity was built in 1842 to replace the medieval parish church of St. Michael & All Angels which was now situated in the countryside over two miles from where the present 19th century village was later built.

See also 
 East Peckham

References 

Church of England church buildings in Kent
Grade II listed churches in Kent